Melbourn Science Park is a science park located in the village of Melbourn, England,  south of Cambridge. It is owned by Bruntwood SciTech.

External links
 Official website

Science and technology in Cambridgeshire
Science parks in the United Kingdom
Science Park